Hodgeville School is a public K-12 school in Hodgeville, Saskatchewan in Canada.

History 
When founded in 1917, Hodgeville school was a one-room school house one mile out of the village. Later, the school house was moved into town. The First year High School, which included Grade 8, was open was 1963 and the Hodgeville elementary school was opened in 1966. 

In 1987, there was concern that the school would close due to the agricultural economic decline in the 1980s: "A few stores and garages are still open amid the boarded- up buildings on Main Street, but the only vibrant spot in Hodgeville is the school where the local farmers send their children. Once that goes, I can't see the town surviving." Hodgeville was home to two schools until 2002, when the Elementary School underwent renovations. In 2004 grades 7-12 moved over to the Elementary school, and it became "Hodgeville School".

Sports Teams and Mascot 
The sports at Hodgeville include volleyball, badminton, cross country running, golf, curling and track and field. The Coyote is the school mascot.

Principals of Hodgeville School from 1959 to 2011

References

Elementary schools in Saskatchewan
High schools in Saskatchewan
Educational institutions established in 1917
1917 establishments in Saskatchewan